Galip Güzel (born 10 January 1987) is a Turkish footballer who plays as a midfielder for Kuşadasıspor.

Trophies
1x 1.Lig runners-up medal

External links

1987 births
People from Merzifon
Living people
Turkish footballers
Association football midfielders
Bandırmaspor footballers
Ankaraspor footballers
Alanyaspor footballers
Sivasspor footballers
Çaykur Rizespor footballers
Adana Demirspor footballers
Menemenspor footballers
Manisa FK footballers
Şanlıurfaspor footballers
Süper Lig players
TFF First League players
TFF Second League players
TFF Third League players